(I Got No Kick Against) Modern Jazz is a 1995 tribute album by various jazz artists and bands from the GRP Records label.  It consists of jazz cover versions of songs originally by The Beatles. The album's title comes from the lyrics of the Beatles's cover of the Chuck Berry song, "Rock and Roll Music", which was originally released on the studio album Beatles for Sale.

Critical reaction
AllMusic found most of the tracks too similar to the originals, making it "predictable and quite forgettable". In contrast, BusinessWorld called it a "wonderful, delightful album" and praised it for mixing mainstream pop jazz with more adventurous sounds. The Record (New Jersey) called it "timeless music played with reverence and charm"; they also noted that all the guitarists on the record were far more skilled than George Harrison.

Chris Ingham praised Diana Krall's version of "And I Love Her", noting its "sultry approach" over "seven luxurious minutes" of music.

Dave Grusin was nominated for a Grammy for Best Pop Instrumental Performance for his cover of "Yesterday" on the album.

Remixes
Groove Collective's "I Want You (She's So Heavy)" was released in a number of remixes for the dance floor in 1996.

Track listing

References

1995 compilation albums
The Beatles tribute albums
Jazz compilation albums
GRP Records compilation albums